The fourth season of The Sing-Off premiered on December 9, 2013. The number of a cappella groups was decreased from sixteen back to ten, resulting in a new format. Nick Lachey stayed as host for the new season, with Ben Folds and Shawn Stockman returning as judges. New to the judges' table was Jewel, who replaces Sara Bareilles, who left after one season. Deke Sharon returned as music director and vocal producer. The music staff included Ed Boyer, Ben Bram, Rob Dietz, and Nick Girard. The program ran for seven episodes over the course of two weeks and concluded on December 23, 2013.

Though the show's status was unclear after the third season concluded in 2012, NBC announced in March 2013 that it would bring back the program as a special like the first two seasons.

A group was eliminated from the show each week in a new feature called the "Ultimate Sing-Off", where the two groups ranked lowest at the end of each show would compete by singing the same song. The groups took turns alternating verses, before ending the song singing together. Also unlike previous seasons, the winner was chosen by the judges instead of by the general public.

Competitors

Elimination table

Performances

Episode 1 (December 9, 2013)
 Theme: Contestants' choice
 Group Performance: "Some Nights", "We Are Young", and "Carry On" by fun.

Episode 2 (December 11, 2013)
 Theme: Party Anthems
 Group Performance: "Let's Get It Started" by The Black Eyed Peas, "Die Young" by Ke$ha   and "Don't Stop the Music" by Rihanna.

Episode 3 (December 12, 2013)
 Theme: #1 Hits
 Group Performance: "In Your Eyes" by Peter Gabriel.

Episode 4 (December 16, 2013)
 Theme: My Generation
 Group Performance: "My Generation" by The Who, "We Will Rock You" by Queen, and "It's Time" by Imagine Dragons.

Episode 5 (December 18, 2013)
 Theme: Movie Night
 Group Performance: "(I've Had) The Time of My Life" from the film Dirty Dancing.
 In this episode every group competes in the Ultimate Sing-Off Challenge by default.

Episode 6 (December 19, 2013)
 Theme: Judges' Choice
 Group Performance: "Shake It Out" by Florence and the Machine.

Episode 7 (December 23, 2013)
Group Performance including all groups from Season 4: "Man in the Mirror" by Michael Jackson.
Nick Lachey and Jewel sang "It Had to Be You" to each other at the beginning of the episode.
Pentatonix (season 3 winners) performed "I Need Your Love" by Calvin Harris feat. Ellie Goulding.
98 Degrees performed "I'll Be Home for Christmas"

Ratings

Contestants' appearances on other talent shows
Jo Vinson of Element appeared on season three of The Sing-Off as a member of Delilah.
VJ Rosales of The Filharmonic appeared on season three of The Voice, but he failed to turn a chair.

References

External links
 
 

2013 American television seasons